Boy Erased is a 2018 American biographical drama film based on Garrard Conley's 2016 memoir of the same name. It is written and directed by Joel Edgerton, who also produced with Kerry Kohansky Roberts and Steve Golin. The film stars Lucas Hedges, Nicole Kidman, Russell Crowe, and Edgerton, and follows the son of Baptist parents who is forced to take part in a conversion therapy program.

Boy Erased premiered at the Telluride Film Festival on September 1, 2018, and also screened at the Toronto International Film Festival. The film was theatrically released in the United States on November 2, 2018, by Focus Features and grossed over $11 million worldwide. It received generally positive reviews from critics, who mostly praised the performances of the cast, and received various award nominations, including two Golden Globe Award nominations: Best Actor for Hedges and Best Original Song for "Revelation". The film won the GLAAD Media Award for Outstanding Film – Limited Release at the 30th GLAAD Media Awards.

Plot 
Jared Eamons is the son of Marshall Eamons, a successful car dealer and Baptist preacher in Arkansas, and Nancy Eamons, a hairdresser. He begins his first day at the Love in Action gay conversion therapy assessment program in Memphis, Tennessee. 

Chief therapist Victor Sykes tells the group that their sexuality is a choice influenced by poor parenting. He instructs them to perform harsh "moral inventories" of themselves and their families and requires them not to tell anyone else about what occurs during the sessions. While performing his moral inventory, Jared thinks of his life prior to entering the program. 

In high school, he was happy, though he broke up with his girlfriend upon starting college. Once there, he became friends with another student, Henry. While staying the night in Jared's dorm room in bunk beds, Henry rapes Jared, apologizes and tearfully confesses doing the same to another young man. Traumatized, Jared returned home.

Henry called the Eamons's home and posed as a school counselor in order to out Jared and ensure his silence. Jared tells his parents this was another student who had told him things about his past and was afraid of Jared revealing his secrets. Jared later agrees that he is attracted to men. After consulting with other pastors, Marshall prays over his son, and then signs him up for conversion therapy, to which Jared reluctantly agrees.

Nancy rents a nearby motel room for her and Jared to stay in until he completes the assessment; however, Jared soon discovers that the therapy has no set end point if he fails to convince Sykes that he has become heterosexual. Some students are "confessing" and playing the game so they can leave; others truly hope to change.

Jared tells his mother the program teaches the participants to see their parents as troubled and that is why they are not supposed to talk about what goes on to them, to safeguard the program's continued funding. Nancy insists Jared lets her read the program's handbook, which contains questionable psychology and many grammatical and typographical errors.

It appears that Jared will be at the institution for some time. After failing an exercise, attendee Cameron is humiliated by Sykes in front of the group and intimidated with a fake funeral service. He is beaten with Bibles by both the therapists and his own family and is forcibly dunked in a bathtub. A horrified Jared looks on.

Later, Jared thinks of a brief encounter he had with an art student in college. He uses it when it his time to confess, but Sykes finds holding hands with a boy to be an inadequate admission and pushes him to give more explicit details. Jared says he will not lie, so Sykes pushes him to talk about Henry. He is shocked and refuses, so Sykes then attempts to make Jared "use his anger" and say he hates his father. Jared refuses to do this, as it is Sykes that he is angry with. 

Jared storms out of the room, retrieves his phone and calls Nancy, begging her to pick him up. Sykes, his assistants and the other attendees corner him behind a locked door despite Nancy's presence. Cameron stands up for him and helps get Jared to Nancy, who takes him home.

Nancy is horrified that she has allowed her husband to enroll Jared in an unvetted program without researching its practices. Marshall remains adamant about Jared remaining in the program, but Nancy steadfastly overrules him. Soon after, Jared learns from the police, via his mother, that Cameron committed suicide while still in the program's care. Marshall approaches Jared to console him, but Jared turns away.

Four years later, Jared is living in New York City with his boyfriend. He writes an article that exposes the realities of the Love in Action program. Jared returns home to convince his father to read the article and tells him he is the one who must change, not Jared. He invites his father to join his mother in visiting him for Christmas.

Cast

Production 

On June 8, 2017, it was revealed that a bidding war had begun between Netflix, Annapurna Pictures, Focus Features, and Amazon Studios for distribution rights to a film package set to star Lucas Hedges, Joel Edgerton, Nicole Kidman and Russell Crowe, and be directed and written by Edgerton, based on Garrard Conley's memoir Boy Erased. On June 21, 2017, it was announced that the bidding war for distribution rights for Boy Erased had boiled down to Netflix and Focus Features, and the latter ultimately won the rights.

In the press release, Edgerton spoke proudly of the project, stating:

In August 2017, the majority of the supporting cast was announced. In September 2017, Joe Alwyn and Madelyn Cline joined the cast as well, and principal photography on the film began September 8, 2017, in Atlanta, Georgia. In April 2018, re-shoots took place.

Departures from source
The film makes several key changes to Garrard Conley's 2016 memoir. One pivotal scene in the film depicts the director of Love in Action pushing a lapsed participant onto his knees in front of a coffin and then having the young man beaten with a Bible. This scene does not take place in Conley's memoir. Scenes where a young man is dunked underwater and guards physically attempt to prevent Conley from leaving the treatment facility were also not present in the memoir.

Analysis 
Commentators on this film have focused on the film's portrayal of conversion therapy and the context surrounding its implementation. According to Ross Ufberg in his article "Survival Tales from the Ex-Gay Movement", conversion therapy is best understood as "a form of counseling (vigorously opposed by the American Psychiatric Association) that aims to change the sexual orientation of patients by treating homosexuality as a mental disorder". The specific program referenced in the movie, Love in Action (LIA), was a facility in which individuals spent anywhere from a few weeks to multiple years. LIA represented a faction of a broader Christian, ex-gay movement that was sparked following the removal of homosexuality from the Diagnostic and Statistical Manual of Mental Disorders by the American Psychological Association in 1973, according to Austin Williams Miller. In the years following this removal, various associations funded research to showcase the efficacy of conversion therapy, including the National Association for Research and Therapy of Homosexuality. Williams Miller notes that activism fueled Boy Erased. Such activism protests the fact that as of May 2019, conversion therapy is still legal for minors in most jurisdictions in the United States.

Multiple sources point out the hypocrisy in some of the members of LIA who are noted in the film. In further analysis of the true story behind the film, Ross Ufberg discussed John Smid, an individual who spent years preaching the LIA ideology but eventually abandoned the program to live an openly gay life. According to Ufberg's analysis, Smid married two women prior to marrying a man. Subsequently, Smid publicly apologized and acknowledged that his "public presence is a trigger" to some people. Williams Miller noted that many of the lead members of LIA now live openly gay lives.

Release
The film had its world premiere at the Telluride Film Festival on September 1, 2018. It also screened at the Toronto International Film Festival, first for the press and industry on September 8, 2018, and then for the public on September 11, 12 and 15. The film was initially scheduled for release on September 28, 2018, but was pushed back to November 2, 2018.

Reception

Box office
Boy Erased opened in five theaters and grossed $207,057, an average of $41,411 per venue, the thirteenth-highest opening weekend per-theater average of 2018. In its second weekend, it grossed $758,173 from 77 theaters. Overall, Boy Erased grossed $6.8 million in the United States and Canada and $4.6 million in other territories for a total worldwide gross of $11.4 million.

Critical response
The website's critical consensus reads, "Anchored in empathy by writer-director-star Joel Edgerton, Boy Erased proves the road to complex, powerfully performed drama can also be paved with good intentions." On Metacritic, the film has a weighted average score of 69 out of 100, based on 48 critics, indicating "generally favorable reviews". Audiences polled by PostTrak gave the film a 95 percent overall positive score and an 85 percent "definite recommend".

A.O. Scott of the New York Times noted a lack of nuance in the characterization of the Eamons family. Consequently, Scott felt the movie became no more than a "summary of its noble intentions".  Ben Travis's review of the film on the news site Empire held a similar sentiment to Scott's, acknowledging that it "navigates the intersection between traditional religious beliefs and internalized homophobia". Despite positive remarks, Travis believed that the film failed to "connect as a human drama". Chris Nashawaty of Entertainment Weekly held a similar attitude, noting the film's strong message but stating it could have been better executed. Another critique, from Peter Bradshaw of The Guardian, declared that the movie was lacking "comedy and lightness". Some critics homed in on the film's quality, like Benjamin Lee of The Guardian, who remarked of the film: "It's a curiously underwhelming, muted, often plodding two hours that fails to reach the emotional highs and devastating lows" that would be anticipated.

Accolades

Notes

References

External links
 
 
 
 

2018 films
2010s coming-of-age drama films
2018 biographical drama films
2018 LGBT-related films
American biographical drama films
American coming-of-age drama films
American LGBT-related films
Biographical films about writers
Coming-of-age films based on actual events
Films about conversion therapy
Drama films based on actual events
Focus Features films
Films about rape
Films set in Arkansas
Films set in Memphis, Tennessee
Films set in Tennessee
Films set in New York City
Films shot in Atlanta
Films based on autobiographies
Gay-related films
LGBT-related drama films
Films about LGBT and Christianity
LGBT-related films based on actual events
Films about anti-LGBT sentiment
Films directed by Joel Edgerton
Films produced by Joel Edgerton
Films with screenplays by Joel Edgerton
2018 drama films
LGBT-related coming-of-age films
2010s English-language films
Films about mother–son relationships
Films about father–son relationships
Biographical films about LGBT people
2010s American films